Mother Teresa of Calcutta Medical Center (MTCMC) is a tertiary hospital in San Fernando, Pampanga, Philippines.

History 
Founded by Vilma Caluag. Owned and operated by Mount Grace Hospitals, Inc., Mother Teresa of Calcutta Medical Center was founded on February 28, 2006, at MacArthur Highway, Barangay Maimpis, City of San Fernando, Pampanga. It initially started with 100 capacity and today, it already has 142 beds with 415 doctors.

Awards and recognition 
The City of San Fernando Health Office awarded MTCMC as the healthiest hospital, in large category for three consecutive years. It has been recognized as the Center of Excellence by the Philippine Health Insurance Corporation. In 2012, it was granted certification by ISO 9001:2008, ISO 14001:2004 and OHSAS 18001:2007.

Services and Departments 
Center provides the following services:

 The Cancer Unit
 Cardiology Unit
 Dental Unit 
 Emergency Unit
 Endoscopy Unit
 Eye Center
 Hemodialysis Unit
 Clinical Laboratory & Pathology
 Operating Room
 Surgery & Anesthesia Care
 Neonatal ICU
 OB-GYNE Complex
 Newborn Service
 Pediatric ICU
 EEG Services
 Pharmacy Unit
 Physical Medicine and Rehabilitation 
 Pulmonary Unit
 Radiology Unit
 Nuclear Medicine

Admissions 
Patients can be admitted to Mother Teresa of Calcutta Medical Center 24 hours a day, 7 days a week.

References

External links 
 Official Website
 ISO 9001:2008
 ISO 14001:2004

Hospital buildings completed in 2006
Hospitals in the Philippines
Buildings and structures in San Fernando, Pampanga
Memorials to Mother Teresa
21st-century architecture in the Philippines